Lighthouse Theatre may refer to:

Lighthouse (arts centre, Poole)
Lighthouse Theatre (Kettering)
Lighthouse Theatre (Warrnambool), Victoria, Australia

See also
Light House Media Centre, Wolverhampton